Róisín Upton (born 1 April 1994) is an Ireland women's field hockey international. She was a member of the Ireland team that played in the 2018 Women's Hockey World Cup final. Upton was also a member of the Connecticut Huskies teams that won the 2013 and 2014 NCAA Division I Field Hockey Championships.

Early years and education
Upton is the daughter of Dermot and Pauline Upton
and is originally from Janesboro on the south side of the city. She has two older brothers, Diarmaid and Sean, both of whom have played rugby union for Munster at schoolboy level and have played for Young Munster in the All-Ireland League. Upton attended An Mhodh Scoil and Crescent College before studying at the University of Connecticut where she gained a BA in Psychology. In 2019 she completed her two years Masters in Primary education in Mary Immaculate College Limerick. As well as playing field hockey in her youth, Upton also played ladies' Gaelic football for Mungret St. Pauls  and women's association football for Janesboro.

Domestic teams

Early years
Upton started playing field hockey at Crescent College and then subsequently with Catholic Institute. She helped Crescent College win two Munster Schools Junior Cup and two Senior Cup titles. She also captained the Crescent College team. She helped Catholic Institute challenge for Munster club honours.

Munster and Ireland youth player of the year in 2011

Connecticut Huskies
Between 2012 and 2016 Upton attended the University of Connecticut. During this time she was a prominent member of the Connecticut Huskies teams that won the 2013 and 2014 NCAA Division I Field Hockey Championships. Upton captained the team during the 2014 season and in 2014 and 2015 was nominated for the Honda Sports Award. Upton also helped the team win four consecutive Big East Conference Field Hockey Tournaments between 2012 and 2015. During her time with the Connecticut Huskies, Upton also worked as a member of the teams coaching staff.

Cork Harlequins
In November 2016 Upton began playing for Cork Harlequins in the Women's Irish Hockey League. Her teammates at Harlequins include Yvonne O'Byrne. Upton, along with O'Byrne and Naomi Carroll, played for Harlequins in the 2017 Irish Senior Cup final, losing 1–0 to UCD. In 2017–18 she helped Harlequins finish as runners up in both the Women's Irish Hockey League and the EY Champions Trophy.

Catholic Institute
In 2018 Upton re-joined Catholic Institute as they became founder members of the Women's Irish Hockey League Division 2.

Ireland international
Together with Emily Beatty and Katie Mullan, Upton represented Ireland at the 2010 Youth Olympic Games. Graham Shaw first included Upton in an Ireland squad in 2015. In January 2016 she was also included in a squad for series of away games against Spain. However, on both occasions Upton had to withdraw from the squads because of injuries. She eventually made her senior debut on 6 November 2016 against Scotland. In January 2017 she was a member of the Ireland team that won a 2016–17 Women's FIH Hockey World League Round 2 tournament in Kuala Lumpur, defeating Malaysia 3–0 in the final. Upton scored four goals in the tournament. On 17 January 2017 she scored her first senior Ireland goal in a 10–0 win against Hong Kong. On 19 January 2017 she scored a hat-trick in a 10–0 against Singapore.

Upton represented Ireland at the 2018 Women's Hockey World Cup and was a prominent member of the team that won the silver medal. She featured in all of Ireland's games throughout the tournament, including the pool games against the United States, India and England, the quarter-final against India, the semi-final against Spain  and the final against the Netherlands. In opening game against the United States, Upton provided an assist for Anna O'Flanagan. In the quarter-final against India, she was the first Ireland player to score in the penalty shoot-out.

Honours
Ireland
Women's Hockey World Cup
Runners Up: 2018
Women's FIH Hockey World League
Winners: 2017 Kuala Lumpur Tournament
Women's FIH Hockey Series
Runners Up: 2019 Banbridge
Women's Four Nations Cup
Runners Up: 2017
Connecticut Huskies
NCAA Division I Field Hockey Championship
Winners: 2013, 2014
Big East Conference Field Hockey Tournament
Winners: 2012, 2013, 2014, 2015
Cork Harlequins
Women's Irish Hockey League
Runners Up: 2017–18
Irish Senior Cup
Runners Up: 2016–17
EY Champions Trophy
Runners Up: 2018
Crescent College
Munster Schools Senior Cup
Winners 2010, 2011
Munster Schools Junior Cup
Winners:  2008,  2009

References

External links
 
 Róisín Upton at Hockey Ireland
 

1994 births
Living people
Irish female field hockey players
Sportspeople from Limerick (city)
Female field hockey midfielders
Ireland international women's field hockey players
People educated at Crescent College
UConn Huskies field hockey players
UConn Huskies field hockey coaches
University of Connecticut alumni
Field hockey players at the 2010 Summer Youth Olympics
Republic of Ireland women's association footballers
Limerick ladies' Gaelic footballers
Alumni of Mary Immaculate College, Limerick
Irish field hockey coaches
Women's association footballers not categorized by position
Expatriate field hockey players
Irish expatriate sportspeople in the United States
Women's Irish Hockey League players
Ladies' Gaelic footballers who switched code
Field hockey players at the 2020 Summer Olympics
Olympic field hockey players of Ireland